Ross Sports Center is a 2,500-seat indoor arena in Colchester, Vermont. It is used primarily for basketball, and is home to the Saint Michael's College Knights basketball and volleyball teams. It was built in 1973. Adjacent to the arena is a swimming pool, used by the college's swimming and diving teams. The college's athletics training room is also located at the arena, across from the basketball and volleyball courts.

Ross Sports Center is also a concert venue, seating up to 3,000. Graduation ceremonies, meetings and other special events are held here.

External links
 Ross Sports Center at smcathletics.com
 St. Michael's College Meeting Spaces

Basketball venues in Vermont
Indoor arenas in Vermont
Sports venues in Vermont
Saint Michael's College
Buildings and structures in Colchester, Vermont